No Pares de Sudar is the second album by Venezuelan group Calle Ciega, released in 1999 and re-released on September 10, 2002.

Track listing
 No Pares de Sudar
 Pomposo
 Solo Te Quiero Amar
 El Marciano
 Tengo Fiebre
 Comienza a Menear
 Que Tu Quieres
 Imaginate
 La Pantallera
 Between You And I

1999 albums
Calle Ciega albums